Leightonite is a rare sulfate mineral with formula of K2Ca2Cu(SO4)4•2H2O.

Crystal class
Leightonite forms flattened to elongated bladed crystals of variously interpreted crystal structure. Its crystal system is reported as triclinic morphologically, but also as pseudo-orthorhombic due to intricate lamellar twinning that mimics orthorhombic symmetry. Because it is triclinic, the crystal is represented by a system of three unequal vectors with corresponding unequal angles between them.

Optical class
Leightonite is anisotropic, meaning it has more than one refractive index, in this case three as it is biaxial. The mineral can split polarized light into two rays with different direction and velocity, resulting in the appearance of interference colors when recombined and viewed under polarized light.

Discovery and occurrence
It was first described in 1938 for an occurrence in the Chuquicamata Mine, Colama, El Loa Province, Antofagasta Region, Chile, and named in honor of Tomas Leighton Donoso (1896–1967), Professor of Mineralogy at the University of Santiago, Chile.

It occurs in alkali oxidized zones of copper deposits and is associated with natrochalcite, blodite, atacamite, bellingerite, kröhnkite, gypsum and quartz in the discovery location at Chuquicamata, Chile, along with chalcanthite, anhydrite and lammerite in Tsumeb, Namibia. It has also been reported from the Schwaz area of North Tyrol, Austria, and the Visdalen Soapstone Quarry, Lom, Norway.

At the mining site of Chuquicamata, Chile, Leightonite is not found in rich ore; rather it only appears in borderland material within  of the surface, acting as a cement between rock fragments as it fills in cracks and cross-fiber veins in surfaces as a network of crystals. Although a hydrous sulfate of copper, it is not a major source of the element. Because of its rare nature, it is valued by mineral collectors.

References

Potassium minerals
Calcium minerals
Copper(II) minerals
Sulfate minerals
Monoclinic minerals
Minerals in space group 15
Minerals described in 1938